Bengt Forslund (born 22 June 1932) is a Swedish film producer, screenwriter and production manager. He produced and co-wrote (with Jan Troell) The Emigrants (1971), for which he was nominated for Academy Awards for both Best Picture and Writing Adapted Screenplay. At the 8th Guldbagge Awards he won the Special Achievement award.

Selected filmography
 4x4 (1965)
 The Corridor (1968)
 Made in Sweden (1969)
 The Emigrants (1971)
 Pistol (1973)
 A Handful of Love (1974)
 Gangsterfilmen (1974)
 The White Wall (1975)
 Hello Baby (1976)
 Games of Love and Loneliness (1977)

References

External links

1932 births
Living people
Swedish film producers
Swedish screenwriters
Swedish male screenwriters
Producers who won the Best Film Guldbagge Award